Statistics of Kuwaiti Premier League for the 1985–86 season.

Overview
It was contested by 7 teams, and Kazma Sporting Club won the championship.

League standings

References
Kuwait - List of final tables (RSSSF)

1986
1985–86 in Asian association football leagues
1